Karam Elahi Bandial is a Pakistani politician who was a Member of the Provincial Assembly of the Punjab, from 2008 to May 2018.

Early life and education
He was born on 1 May 1961 in Khushab.

He graduated in 1981 from Government College, Lahore and has a degree of Bachelor of Arts.

Political career

He ran for the seat of the Provincial Assembly of the Punjab as an independent candidate from Constituency PP-40 (Khushab-II) in 2002 Pakistani general election, but was unsuccessful. He received 24,307 votes and lost the seat to Malik Saleh Muhammad Ganjial, a candidate of National Alliance.

He was elected to the Provincial Assembly of the Punjab as an independent candidate from Constituency PP-40 (Khushab-II) in 2008 Pakistani general election. He received 26,494 votes and defeated Malik Hassan Nawaz Gunjial, an independent candidate.

He was re-elected to the Provincial Assembly of the Punjab as a candidate of Pakistan Muslim League (N) (PML-N) from Constituency PP-40 (Khushab-II) in 2013 Pakistani general election. He received 45,854 votes and defeated  Muhammad Saleh Muhammad Ganjial, an independent candidate.

References

Living people
Punjab MPAs 2013–2018
1961 births
Pakistan Muslim League (N) politicians
Punjab MPAs 2008–2013